Wild Horse Creek or Wildhorse Creek may refer to:
 Wild Horse Creek (Solano County) in California
 Wild Horse Creek (Colorado)
 Wild Horse Creek (Mississippi)
 Wildhorse Creek (Oklahoma)
 Wildhorse Creek (Alvord Lake) in Oregon
 Wildhorse Creek (Texas)
 Wild Horse Creek (Wyoming)
 Wild Horse River, formerly known as Wild Horse Creek, in British Columbia